Melissa Sneekes, is a beauty pageant contestant who represented the Netherlands in Miss World 2007 in China.

References

1983 births
Living people
Miss World 2007 delegates
Dutch beauty pageant winners
People from The Hague